Alice Dubois (born 20 April 1970) is a French judoka. She competed in the women's middleweight event at the 1996 Summer Olympics.

References

External links
 

1970 births
Living people
French female judoka
Olympic judoka of France
Judoka at the 1996 Summer Olympics
People from Levallois-Perret
Sportspeople from Hauts-de-Seine
20th-century French women
21st-century French women